Jahangir Alam can refer to:

 Jahangir Alam (cricketer, born 1973), Bangladeshi cricketer
 Jahangir Alam (cricketer, born 1991), Bangladeshi cricketer
 Jahangir Alam (politician) (born 1979), Bangladeshi politician
 Jahangir Alam (umpire) (born 1962), Bangladeshi cricket umpire
 Jahangir Alam Talukdar (born 1968), Bangladeshi cricketer